Staffin is a district with the Gaelic name An Taobh Sear, which translates as "the East Side", on the northeast coast of the Trotternish peninsula of the island of Skye. The district comprises 23 townships made up of, from south to north, Rigg, Tote, Lealt, Lonfearn, Grealin, Breackry, Cul-nan-cnoc, Bhaltos, Raiseburgh, Ellishadder, Garafad, Clachan, Garros, Marrishader, Maligar, Stenscholl, Brogaig, Sartle, Glasphein, Digg, Dunan, Flodigarry and Greap. 
The Kilmartin River runs northwards through the village. From where it reaches the sea a rocky shore leads east to a slipway at An Corran. Here a local resident found a slab bearing a dinosaur track, probably made by a small ornithopod. Experts subsequently found more dinosaur prints of up to 50 cm, the largest found in Scotland, made by a creature similar to Megalosaurus. At about 160 million years old they are the youngest dinosaur remains to be found in Scotland.

A Mesolithic hunter-gatherer site dating to the 7th millennium BC at An Corran is one of the oldest archaeological sites in Scotland. Its occupation is probably linked to that of the rock shelter at Sand, Applecross on the coast of Wester Ross.

In the modern era this part of Skye retains a strong Gaelic identity with 61 per cent of the local population recorded as speaking the language in 2001. In September 2010, Comunn na Gàidhlig named Staffin as their "Gaelic Community of the Year", in the first year this competition has run. Also in September 2010, Highland Council announced the launch of a consultation into a plan to convert the local primary into a Gaelic medium school. This would be the second such conversion in Scotland, after Bun-sgoil Shlèite. Only 5 out of the school's thirty pupils have English as their only language, with the remainder being bilingual English and Gaelic speakers.

In 2011 it was reported that Staffin Island may be the last in Scotland where the old tradition of having cattle swim between grazings is still carried out.  Crofter Iain MacDonald, who used to swim with the animals, now uses a boat to encourage them to swim from Staffin Island to Skye in early spring and back again in October.

References

Populated places in the Isle of Skye